Katrin Rutschow-Stomporowski ( Rutschow, born 2 April 1975 in Waren (Müritz)) is a German rower and two-time Olympic gold medalist. She married Bernhard Stomporowski, a lightweight men's world championship medallist, in December 1999.

References

External links 
 Katrin Rutschow-Stomporowski at DatabaseOlympics

1975 births
Living people
People from Waren (Müritz)
People from Bezirk Neubrandenburg
German female rowers
Sportspeople from Mecklenburg-Western Pomerania
Olympic rowers of Germany
Rowers at the 1996 Summer Olympics
Rowers at the 2000 Summer Olympics
Rowers at the 2004 Summer Olympics
Olympic medalists in rowing
Medalists at the 2004 Summer Olympics
Medalists at the 2000 Summer Olympics
Medalists at the 1996 Summer Olympics
Olympic gold medalists for Germany
Olympic bronze medalists for Germany
World Rowing Championships medalists for Germany
Recipients of the Silver Laurel Leaf
20th-century German women